The Great Pretender is a 2018 American black comedy-drama film, directed by Nathan Silver, from a screenplay by Jack Dunphy, from a story by Dunphy and Silver. It stars Esther Garrel, Keith Poulson, Maelle Poesy and Linas Phillips.

The film had its world premiere at the Tribeca Film Festival on April 21, 2018.

Cast
 Esther Garrel as Thérése
 Keith Poulson as Chris
 Maelle Poesy as Mona
 Linas Phillips as Nick
 Julian Grady as Henry
 Danelle Eliav as Hannah
 C. Mason Wells as David
 Brigitte Sy as Thérése's Mom
 Peter Vack as Adrian

Production
In August 2017, it was announced Nathan Silver would direct the series, written by Jack Dunphy, with BricTV producing. It was later edited into a feature film.

Release
The film had its world premiere at the Tribeca Film Festival on April 21, 2018. It will also screen at AFI Fest in November 2018. Factory25 will distribute the film.

References

External links

2018 films
American drama films
American independent films
2010s English-language films
2010s American films